The Ceram Prize is a prize for non-fiction books in archaeology issued by Rheinisches Landesmuseum Bonn. It is named for C. W. Ceram, famous for his popularization of archaeology.

Recipients
The prize has been awarded in irregular intervals.

 1974 - Rudolf Pörtner
 1980 - Lübbe-Verlag for Neue Entdeckungen der Archäologie
 1992 - Wolfgang Wurster for Die Schatz-Gräber. Archäologische Expeditionen durch die Hochkulturen Südamerikas, Hamburg 1991 
 1998 - Marcus Junkelmann for Panis militaris. Die Ernährung des römischen Soldaten oder der Grundstoff der Macht,  Mainz 1997 ("Kulturgeschichte der antiken Welt", vol. 75) 
 2002 - Franco Falchetti and Antonella Romualdi for Die Etrusker, Theiss, Stuttgart 2001

See also

 List of archaeology awards
 List of literary awards

References

Archaeology awards